Paul Thiry is the name of:

 Paul-Henri Thiry (1723–1789), a.k.a. Baron d'Holbach, German-French author, philosopher and encyclopedist
 Paul Thiry (architect) (1904–1993), American architect, chief architect of the Century 21 Exposition